Dichomeris parvisexafurca is a moth in the family Gelechiidae. It was described by Hou-Hun Li, Hui Zhen and Roger C. Kendrick in 2010. It is found in Hong Kong, China.

The wingspan is 9.5–10 mm. The forewings are pale yellow, with scattered dark brown scales and with the costal margin dark brown along the basal five-sixths and with a dark brown spot before the apex. There is a longitudinal dark brown stripe in the distal half of the cell and the fold is brown, the dorsum dark brown and there is a broad dark brown fascia along the termen. The apex is dark brown. The hindwings are grey.

Etymology
The species name is derived from the Latin prefix  parv- (meaning small) and the name of another species, Dichomeris sexafurca, referring to the sicae of this species being smaller than that in D. sexafurca.

References

Moths described in 2010
parvisexafurca